The 2019-2020 National Women Football Championship was the 12th season of the National Women Football Championship, the top-tier of women's football in Pakistan. The tournament took place in two phases: qualifying round in November 2019 and final round from 1 to 12 January 2020 in Karachi.

Pakistan Army were able to defend their title by beating Karachi United 7-1 in the final.

Qualifying round
The qualifying round with 20 teams was held in November and December 2019 in three cities: Islamabad, Karachi and Lahore. The following 8 teams qualified for the final round:

 Diya
 Gilgit-Baltistan FA
 JAFA Soccer Academy
 Karachi Kickers
 Karachi United
 Pakistan Army
 Punjab
 WAPDA

Final round

Teams
For this edition, the qualifying round gathered 20 teams in November and December 2019 in Lahore, Karachi and Islamabad and 8 teams were selected for the final competition, instead of 14 during the 2018 edition and 20 during the 2021 edition starting in March.

Football authorities were alleged to favour Karachi United as the competition took place in their home stadium and criticized because the playing field was not suitable for 11-a-side matches

Group stages

Group A

Group B

Knockout round

Semi-finals

Third place

Finals

Awards 
 Best goalkeeper to Syeda Mahpara, WAPDA’s captain.
 Golden boot to WAPDA's Sahar Zaman for scoring 27 goals.
 Most valuable player to Suha Herani of Karachi United.

References

External links
 Global Sports Archives - 2020 National Women Football Championship

National Women Football Championship seasons
W1
Pakistan
2010s in Pakistani sport
2010s in Pakistani women's sport
2010s in Karachi
2019 in Asian women's sport
2020 in Asian women's sport
2019 in Pakistani women's sport